Mother Anthony's Tavern, also known as At the Inn of Mother Anthony, is an 1866 oil-on-canvas painting made by French artist Pierre-Auguste Renoir during his Fontainebleau period. It is one of Renoir's first major paintings, having completed it at the age of 25. The work is currently in the collection of the Nationalmuseum in Stockholm.

Description
Although there are various competing interpretations of the figures depicted in the painting, it is thought that the girl clearing plates in the front left of the painting is Nana; painter and architect Jules Le Coeur (1832-1882) appears as the bearded man standing up preparing to roll a cigarette, the clean-shaven man sitting down facing the viewer is thought to be Dutch landscape artist "Bos", a friend of Le Coeur; artist Alfred Sisley (1839–1899) appears as the bearded man seated with a hat next to Toto, a three-legged poodle with a wooden leg; in the far right background we see the back of the proprietor, Madame Anthony, wearing a headscarf.

Influences
The painting After Dinner at Ornans (1848–1849) by Gustave Courbet informs this work, showing the influence of Courbet on the early Renoir.

References

External links
 Mother Anthony’s Tavern at the Nationalmuseum

Paintings by Pierre-Auguste Renoir
1866 paintings
Paintings in the collection of the Nationalmuseum Stockholm
Dogs in art
Food and drink paintings